Samuel Blair Mertes (August 6, 1872 – March 12, 1945) was a professional baseball player. He was an outfielder over parts of 10 seasons (1896–1906) with the Philadelphia Phillies, Chicago Orphans, Chicago White Sox, New York Giants, and St. Louis Cardinals. Mertes led the National League in doubles and RBIs in 1903 while playing for New York. He was born in San Francisco, California, and died in Villa Grande, California, at the age of 72.

In 10 seasons, Mertes batted .279 (1227-4405) with 40 home runs and 721 RBI. He stole 396 bases in his career. Mertes' on-base percentage was .346 and his slugging percentage was .398. He had 100+ RBI seasons in 1903 and 1905.

Harpo Marx considered Mertes his favorite player, claiming he was the only member of the Giants he could see from his limited view outside the stadium on Coogan's Bluff.

See also
 List of Major League Baseball career triples leaders
 List of Major League Baseball career stolen bases leaders
 List of Major League Baseball annual runs batted in leaders
 List of Major League Baseball annual doubles leaders
 List of Major League Baseball players to hit for the cycle

References

External links
, or Retrosheet

1872 births
1945 deaths
19th-century baseball players
Major League Baseball outfielders
Major League Baseball left fielders
Major League Baseball center fielders
Major League Baseball right fielders
Major League Baseball second basemen
National League RBI champions
New York Giants (NL) players
Chicago Orphans players
Philadelphia Phillies players
Chicago White Sox players
St. Louis Cardinals players
Minneapolis Millers (baseball) players
Toronto Maple Leafs (International League) players
Baseball players from California